The Chevron Championship is a professional women's golf tournament. An event on the LPGA Tour, it is one of the tour's five major championships, and has traditionally been the first of the season since its elevation to major status in 1983. Founded in 1972 by singer and actress Dinah Shore and Colgate-Palmolive chairman David Foster, it was played at the Mission Hills Country Club in Rancho Mirage, California from its inception through 2022. In 2023, the championship will be played in The Woodlands, Texas for the first time at The Club at Carlton Woods - Jack Nicklaus Signature Course. 

Sometimes referred to as the Dinah Shore, in deference to its founder, the tournament has had many official sponsored titles, all of which included Shore's name until 2000; since then it has been titled as the Nabisco Championship, Kraft Nabisco Championship, and ANA Inspiration.

The championship's time at Mission Hills is associated with several traditions; in 1988, Amy Alcott established a tradition of the event's champion diving into the pond that surrounds the 18th hole, while an annual women's festival coinciding with the championship has been held since 1991, attracting a large number of female tourists to the Rancho Mirage area for the events annually. In 2022, the championship was held in Mission Hills for the final time; as part of its new title sponsorship agreement with Chevron Corporation, the championship will be moved to a new venue in 2023, the Jack Nicklaus Signature Course at The Club at Carlton Woods to coincide with the company's move to the Greater Houston area.

History
Founded in 1972 by Colgate-Palmolive chairman  and entertainer  the championship has been classified as a major since  Since its inception, it has been held annually at the Mission Hills Country Club in Rancho Mirage, California, southeast of Palm Springs. It is the first major of the year, usually played in late March or early April.

At its debut in 1972 as a 54-hole event, it was the richest event in women's  its purse was more than double that of the LPGA Championship or the U.S. Women's Open. The first edition invited all winners of tour events from the previous 

After over twenty years of sponsorship by Nabisco, and parent company Kraft Foods, Japanese airline All Nippon Airways became the title sponsor of the tournament in late 2014, renaming the tournament the ANA Inspiration (in reference to its slogan "Inspiration of Japan"). 

In October 2021, a six-year sponsorship agreement with energy company Chevron Corporation was announced that would see the tournament renamed The Chevron Championship, with an increased prize fund of $5 million in 2022, up from $3 million in 2021. It was also announced that the tournament will be moved to the Jack Nicklaus Signature Course at The Club at Carlton Woods in the Greater Houston area in 2023, with a change of dates. Dinah Shore's daughter Melissa Montgomery established an advisory board to oversee the tournament's transition. 

Officials intend the date change to allow for network television coverage on NBC, it has also been suggested that the tournament was moved in deference to the Augusta National Women's Amateur.

Tournament names

Informally, it is commonly referred to as "the Dinah Shore,"even though her name was removed from the official title in 2000.The winner's trophy bears Shore's name.

"Poppie's Pond"
From 1988 to 2022, the winner traditionally celebrated her victory by jumping in the pond surrounding the 18th green. The pond is known as Champions Lake or "Poppie's Pond" as it was dubbed in 2006 honor of Terry Wilcox, the tournament director from 1994 through 2008; Wilcox is known as "Poppie" to his 

Amy Alcott established the tradition in 1988 to celebrate her second win here, and repeated in 1991, including tournament host  It was not embraced by others until 1994, when Donna Andrews made the leap, followed by Nanci Bowen the next year, and it became an annual  In 1998, winner Pat Hurst waded in only up to her knees, as she could 

Originally a very natural water hazard, the portion near the bridge it is now lined with concrete and has treated water, more like a swimming pool.

Associated events 

A women's festival known as the Club Skirts Dinah Shore Weekend has been held in the city of Palm Springs, California during the week of the tournament, featuring concerts by female musicians, comedy shows, parties, and other events and networking opportunities. The Dinah Shore Weekend was first organized in 1991 by promoter Mariah Hanson, expanding upon afterparties that had become associated with the tournament.

A large number of lesbians and bisexual women visit the Palm Springs area for the festival and tournament; the Dinah Shore Weekend was described by Los Angeles as the "largest annual gathering of queer women and their female allies", while the tournament as a whole had been described as "spring break for lesbians."

Winners

^ Play extended one day due to darkness.
Note: Green highlight indicates scoring records.

Winners as a non-major

Multiple champions
Multiple winners of the event as a major championship.

Through 2018, the only successful defense of the title (as a major) was by Sörenstam in 2002.
 As a non-major (1972–1982), the only multiple winner was Sandra Post (1978, 1979).

References

External links

LPGA official tournament microsite
Mission Hills Country Club – golf
PGA of America – Mission Hills Country Club, Dinah Shore course

 
LPGA Tour events
Women's major golf championships
Golf in California
Women's sports in California
All Nippon Airways
Recurring sporting events established in 1972
1972 establishments in California
Dinah Shore